Hans Christian Wedelsted Nielsen (10 May 1928 – 5 March 1990) was a Danish amateur association football defender. He played 25 matches for the Danish national team from May 1958 to June 1961, and won a silver medal at the 1960 Summer Olympics. Born in Odder, Hansen started his career at Odder IGF but would spend most of his career with nearby top-flight club Aarhus Gymnastikforening (AGF).

After ending his playing career, Nielsen worked as a salesman, and was a lifelong volunteer in the AGF youth department. He died on 5 March 1990 in Aarhus.

References

1928 births
1990 deaths
People from Odder Municipality
Danish men's footballers
Denmark international footballers
Odder IGF players
Aarhus Gymnastikforening players
Footballers at the 1960 Summer Olympics
Olympic footballers of Denmark
Olympic silver medalists for Denmark
Olympic medalists in football
Medalists at the 1960 Summer Olympics
Association football defenders
Sportspeople from the Central Denmark Region